Adolescent crystallization, as defined by Laurence Steinberg, is a stage during adolescence in which individuals, typically ages 14–18, first begin to formulate their ideas about an appropriate occupation.

Identity development

During the crystallization period, adolescents begin to form their own ideas about what is appropriate work for them and learn more about themselves occupationally; this will guide them to their future educational decisions. This is considered to be a part of the path to identity development. An adolescent’s occupational plan for the future involves examining their traits, abilities, interests and values. Occupational plans generally form in stages; the most important time for crystallization to occur is during late adolescence, during this time their plans are more realistically related to his or her capabilities. Social environment influences an adolescent’s choice in occupational plans; they are more likely to look to a role model for guidance.

Studies

A study done by Arizona State University assessed eighth to twelfth graders on career interests and crystallization. The study included 1000 males and 1000 females. Both the males and the females showed stability in their choices and crystallization increased with age. The study showed the importance of the twelfth grade year because crystallization increased with age, therefore this year should be used for career and academic development. A study was done by the University of Minnesota to determine whether working during high school helped form adolescents' choices in crystallization of occupations.

The results of the study showed it was not employment opportunity or number of hours that were worked that affected the occupational value formation. Instead, it was the opportunities given to learn useful skills that created a positive influence. Therefore, the crystallization of career opportunities is more likely to occur in adolescents given the chance to explore and learn new skills in their job during high school. This helps the adolescent with their identity development.

References

Adolescence
Developmental psychology